Paul E. Riley (April 24, 1942 – October 11, 2001) was a United States district judge of the United States District Court for the Southern District of Illinois.

Education and career

Born in Alton, Illinois, Riley received a Bachelor of Science degree from Saint Louis University in 1964 and a Juris Doctor from Saint Louis University School of Law in 1967. He was a Hearing examiner for the Illinois Commerce Commission from 1968 to 1969, and was thereafter in private practice in Edwardsville, Illinois from 1969 to 1985, also serving as an assistant public defender for Madison County, Illinois from 1971 to 1982. He was an associate circuit judge for the Third Circuit Court of Illinois from 1985 to 1986, and a circuit judge for that court from 1986 to 1994, including service as chief circuit judge in 1991.

Federal judicial service

On August 16, 1994, Riley was nominated by President Bill Clinton to a new seat on the United States District Court for the Southern District of Illinois, created by 104 Stat. 5089. He was confirmed by the United States Senate on October 6, 1994, and received his commission on October 7, 1994. Riley served in that capacity until his death, in Edwardsville.

Sources

1942 births
2001 deaths
Illinois state court judges
Judges of the United States District Court for the Southern District of Illinois
United States district court judges appointed by Bill Clinton
Public defenders
Saint Louis University alumni
Saint Louis University School of Law alumni
People from Alton, Illinois
20th-century American judges
21st-century American judges